Paul Mägi (born 13 October 1953) is an Estonian conductor in concert and opera and is also an academic teacher and violinist. He has commissioned works for the Estonian National Opera.

Life and music 
Born in Tallinn (then Soviet Union), Mägi achieved his Abitur at the 42nd secondary school in Tallinn, today's Deutsches Gymnasium Tallinn (Tallinna Saksa Gümnaasium), in the district of Mustamäe. He graduated from the Tallinn Music High School in 1972, where he specialised in violin with Endel Lippus and in trumpet with Tõnu Tarum. He studied trumpet at the Tallinn State Conservatory with Tõnu Tarum, finishing in 1980. He studied further at the Moscow Conservatory, conducting with Gennady Rozhdestvensky, where he graduated in 1984.

Conducting 
Mägi founded a chamber orchestra for the Estonian Radio, which was named the Estonian Radio Chamber Orchestra in 1978. He conducted it until 1984.

Mägi was musical director and chief conductor of the Latvian National Symphony Orchestra (Latvijas Nacionālais simfoniskais orķestris) in Riga from 1990 to 1994. From 1995 to 1997, Mägi was artistic director of the Estonian theatre which was then named the Estonian National Opera. He was its first artistic director and principal conductor from 1998. He commissioned operas from Estonian composers, such as Rene Eespere's Gurmans and Raimo Kangro's Heart. He introduced recordings of operas, including Verdi's Nabucco and Eino Tamberg's Cyrano de Bergerac in 2000, which led to the first recording of Tamberg's opera.

He also performs as a jazz violinist. From the 2010/11 season, he has been chief conductor of the Vanemuine theatre in Tartu.

He has conducted several Estonian orchestras, such as the Estonian National Symphony Orchestra. He conducted premiere recordings, such as Eduard Tubin's opera Reigi õpetaja in 1992 and Erkki-Sven Tüür's Second Symphony in 2004.

Teaching 
Mägi was a teacher of conducting at the Latvian Academy of Music from 1991 to 1994. He has taught conducting at the Estonian Academy of Music and Theatre from 1989. He has given master classes internationally, including the Stockholm Royal College of Music. His students have included Olari Elts, Mihhail Gerts, Lehari Kaustel, Thomas Kemp, Erki Pehk, Pauls Putninš, and Aivo Välja.

Awards 
In 1985, Mägi received the Estonian Prize for Young Musicians. In 1994 he was awarded the Cultural Award of the Republic of Latvia. In 1994, 1996, and 1999 Mägi was awarded the prize of the Estonian Music Theatre Union, and in 2000 the Cultural Prize of the Republic of Estonia, among others.

References

External links 
 
 
 Paul Mägi on Vanemuine
 Paul Mägi conductor on Opera base
 Paul Mägi - Conductor on Svenska KoncertByran
 Paul Mägi BIS Records
 Peter Nagy, Philippe Rouyer (eds.): World Encyclopedia of Contemporary Theatre: Volume 1: Europe, Volume 1 Routledge, p. 243, 2014
 Rob Barnett: Helmer Alexandersson (1886-1927) musicweb-international.com July 2009

1953 births
Estonian conductors (music)
Estonian violinists
Recipients of the Order of the White Star, 4th Class
Living people
Musicians from Tallinn
Estonian Academy of Music and Theatre alumni
Jazz violinists
20th-century Estonian people
21st-century Estonian people